Ronald Johnson Ferrier (26 April 1914 – 11 October 1991) was an English footballer who played in the Football League for Manchester United in the 1930s, and later for and Oldham Athletic. He played for Plymouth Argyle as a wartime guest, and also represented Grimsby Town and Lincoln City before retiring as a player in 1947.

He also played/ and scored once as a guest player for Mossley in the 1939–40 season whilst stationed with the army at Ladysmith Barracks.

He died in October 1991 at the age of 77. He could play at centre and inside forward.

References

External links
MUFCInfo.com profile

1914 births
1991 deaths
People from Cleethorpes
English footballers
Association football forwards
Grimsby Town F.C. players
Manchester United F.C. players
Oldham Athletic A.F.C. players
Plymouth Argyle F.C. wartime guest players
Lincoln City F.C. players
English Football League players
Mossley A.F.C. players